These United States submarines were lost either to enemy action or to "storm or perils of the sea."

Before World War II

Additionally:
, decommissioned as a target, flooded and sank unexpectedly 30 July 1919 in Two Tree Channel near Niantic, Connecticut with the loss of three crew.
She was raised and commissioned 14 October 1922.
 Decommissioned on 2 May 1931, she was berthed at Philadelphia until 26 February 1936 when she sank at her mooring. Later raised, she was struck from the Naval Vessel Register on 12 May 1936 and on 19 August she was used as a target vessel for an aerial bombing test.

During World War II 
During World War II, the U.S. Navy's submarine service suffered the highest casualty percentage of all the American armed forces, losing one in five submariners. Some 16,000 submariners served during the war, of whom 375 officers and 3,131 enlisted men were killed, the highest casualty rate of any American force in World War II.

Fifty-two submarines of the United States Navy were lost during World War II. Two –  and  – were lost to friendly fire (though there is speculation that the Dorado may have struck a German mine), at least three more – Tulibee, Tang, and Grunion – to defective torpedoes, and six to accident or grounding.

Another eight submarines went missing while on patrol and are presumed to have been sunk by Japanese mines, as there were no recorded Japanese anti-submarine attacks in their patrol areas. The other thirty-three lost submarines are known to have been sunk by the Japanese.

Additional casualties

There are two additional casualties to submarines in World War II that are sometimes considered as effectively two additional losses.

 was damaged by Japanese air and surface forces on 14 November 1944. She was able to reach Saipan and later Pearl Harbor on 1 December, departing San Francisco for Portsmouth Navy Yard on 16 February 1945. There it was determined that she was a constructive total loss and beyond economical repair, but might be useful as a school ship, similar to the postwar immobile pierside training submarines. However, her career in this capacity was brief, and Halibut was decommissioned at Portsmouth Navy Yard 18 July 1945 and sold for scrap in January 1947.

 was commissioned on 12 February 1945 and sank at pier 8 at the Boston Navy Yard on 15 March 1945, apparently without loss of life and reportedly still incomplete. She was raised eight days later, decommissioned on 24 March 1945, and never completed or fully repaired. Postwar, she was listed as a Reserve Fleet submarine until stricken in 1958 and scrapped in 1959, having never gone to sea.

Additional incidents

The former  was transferred to the Royal Navy 9 March 1942 and renamed as HMS P.514. On 21 June 1942 she was rammed by the Royal Canadian Navy minesweeper  and sank with all hands.

The former  was sold in 1931 to a private owner for use as a tourist attraction, with the hulk reacquired by the U.S. Navy for "experimental purposes" in 1941. She foundered and sank in the Patuxent River 16 December 1942.

The former  was transferred to the Royal Navy 4 November 1941 and renamed as RMS P.551 then transferred to the Polish Navy in exile and renamed . On 2 May 1942 she was attacked in a friendly fire incident by a Royal Navy minesweeper and destroyer and sank with all hands.

, originally commissioned on 16 December 1918 and decommissioned after more than 12 years of service, was recommissioned and served for five additional years during World War II. R-1 was decommissioned at Key West on 20 September 1945 and was struck from the Naval Vessel Register on 10 November. Raised three days later, she was sold for scrap on 13 March 1946.

Her name was stricken from the Naval Vessel Register three days later.

After World War II

Additional incidents 
 Was decommissioned on 15 November 1945 and sold for scrap 8 June 1957. The Tarpon foundered in deep water, south of Cape Hatteras, North Carolina, on 26 August 1957, while under tow to the scrap yard.

 flooded and sank pier-side prior to commissioning at Mare Island Naval Shipyard on 15 May 1969. Two shipyard teams, apparently unaware of each other's efforts, were conducting work involving filling tanks in both the forward and aft portions of the submarine. Eventually the lack of coordination led to flooding through the bow hatch. The submarine was raised, but completion was delayed 32 months. Guitarro was commissioned on 9 September 1972.

 was decommissioned and struck from the Naval Register 1 October 1970. On 1 June 1971, while under tow near Cape Flattery, Washington state, Bugara swamped and sank accidentally.

 was not repaired after a fire near Florida on 24 April 1988 that killed three crewmembers. She was decommissioned 28 September 1988 and hulked 17 August 1989. The hull was later purchased by Northrop Grumman for testing.

 experienced a fire during overhaul at Portsmouth Naval Shipyard on 23 May 2012 that caused significant damage, though with no loss of life. A civilian shipyard worker confessed to arson. Although repairs were considered, using components from the decommissioned , the estimated cost of $700 million was considered uneconomical in a time of reduced budgets. Miami was decommissioned on 28 March 2014, to be disposed of via the nuclear Ship-Submarine Recycling Program.

See also
 List of U.S. Navy losses in World War II
 Allied submarines in the Pacific War
 Submarines in the United States Navy
 List of submarines of the United States Navy
 List of most successful American submarines in World War II

References

 
 
 
 
 Silverstone, Paul H., U.S. Warships of World War II, Ian Allan, 1965, .

External links
 On Eternal Patrol
 Submarine Photo Archive at NavSource.org
 United States Submarine Veterans Inc. (USSVI)

Submarines
 
Submarines lost
United States submarines, lost